The Canton of Le Prêcheur is a former canton in the Arrondissement of Saint-Pierre on Martinique. It had 1,644 inhabitants (2012). It was disbanded in 2015. The canton comprised the commune of Le Prêcheur.

References

Cantons of Martinique